In military terms, 64th Division or 64th Infantry Division may refer to:

 Infantry Divisions
 64th Infantry Division (Wehrmacht) (Germany)
 64th Division (Imperial Japanese Army)
 64th Infantry Division of Urmia (Iran) 
 64th Rifle Division (Soviet Union) 
 64th Guards Motor Rifle Division (Soviet Union)
 64th (2nd Highland) Division (United Kingdom)
 64th Infantry Division Catanzaro - Italian Army (Second World War)

 Cavalry Divisions
 64th Cavalry Division (United States) 
 64th Cavalry Division (Soviet Union) 

 Aviation Divisions
 64th Air Division (United States)

See also
 64th Regiment (disambiguation)
 64th Squadron (disambiguation)